Christian Gottlob Neefe (5 February 1748 – 28 January 1798) was a German opera composer and conductor. He was known as one of the first teachers of Ludwig van Beethoven.

Life and career
Neefe was born in Chemnitz, Saxony. He received a musical education and started to compose at the age of 12. He studied law at Leipzig University, but subsequently returned to music to become a pupil of the composer Johann Adam Hiller under whose guidance he wrote his first comic operas.

In 1776 Neefe joined the Seyler theatrical company of Abel Seyler (then) in Dresden, and inherited the position of musical director from his mentor, Hiller. He later became court organist in Bonn and was the principal piano teacher of Ludwig van Beethoven. He helped Beethoven produce some of his first works. His best known work was a Singspiel called Adelheit von Veltheim (1780). He died in Dessau.

Works

Operas

Other works
Oden von Klopstock: Serenade for piano and voice. Flensburg 1776
Variations on the Priestermarsch aus der Zauberflöte
Twelve piano sonatas
Rondo in C major

References

External links

Operone Neefe page, accessed 13 November 2009

1748 births
1798 deaths
German opera composers
Male opera composers
German male classical composers
People from Chemnitz
Seyler theatrical company
18th-century classical composers
18th-century German composers
18th-century male musicians